Daniel Mier Gusfield is an American computer scientist, Distinguished Professor of Computer Science at  the University of California, Davis.   Gusfield is known for his research in combinatorial optimization and computational biology.

Education
Gusfield received his undergraduate degree in computer science at the University of California, Berkeley in 1973, his Master of Science degree in computer science from the University of California, Los Angeles (UCLA) in 1975, and his PhD in Engineering Science from Berkeley in 1980; his doctoral advisor was Richard Karp.

Career and research
Gusfield joined the faculty at Yale University in Computer Science in 1980, and left in 1986 to join the Department of Computer Science at UC Davis as an associate professor.  Gusfield was made Professor of Computer Science in 1992 and served as the  chair of the Department of Computer Science at UC Davis from 2000 to 2004.   Gusfield was named distinguished professor in 2016, which is the highest campus-wide rank at the University of California at Davis.

Gusfield's early work was in combinatorial optimization and its real-world application. One of his early major results was in network flow, where he presented a simple technique to  convert any network flow algorithm to one that builds a Gomory-Hu tree, using only five added lines of pseudo-code. Another contribution was in stable matching, where he contributed to a polynomial-time algorithm  for the Egalitarian Stable Marriage Problem, proposed by Donald Knuth. Gusfield's work on stable marriage resulted in the  book, co-authored with Robert Irving, The Stable Marriage Problem: Structure and Algorithms.

Starting in 1984, Gusfield branched out into computational biology, making Gusfield one of the first computer scientists to work in this field. His first result in computational biology was written in the Yale Technical Report The Steiner-Tree Problem in Phylogeny, which has never been published in a journal. His first published paper in computational biology, "Efficient Algorithms for Inferring Evolutionary History", was initially published as a technical report in 1988, and was subsequently was published in the journal Networks; this paper is now the most cited of Gusfield's papers. Gusfield's 1993 paper on multiple sequence alignment is the first publication indexed in  PubMed under "computational biology".

Gusfield's impact on the early days of Computer Science research in algorithmic computational biology is substantial. He was a member of the United States Department of Energy Human Genome Research Program Panel in 1991, and a member of the steering committee for the Rutgers-Princeton DIMACS center special year on Mathematical Support for Molecular Biology  from 1994 to 1995. In 1995, he co-organized the  Dagstuhl Conference on Molecular Bioinformatics.  He has been a member of the editorial board of the Journal of Computational Biology since its inception in 1996. At the University of California at Davis, he was part of a three-person group that proposed the development of the UC Davis Genomics Center, and served as a member of the Genomics Center Steering Committee (1999–2003), and helped to build an interdisciplinary community of biologists and computer scientists working together on genomics problems.  Finally, in 2004, Gusfield helped propose the IEEE/ACM Transactions on Computational Biology and Bioinformatics (TCBB), one of the few journals specifically oriented towards computer science and mathematical researchers working in computational biology.  He served as its founding editor in chief until 2009, and later as chair of the TCBB Steering Committee. He was more recently an invited visiting scientist at the Simons Institute for the Theory of Computing at UC Berkeley during two of its semester-long programs (first on Evolution, and later on Algorithmic Challenges in Genomics). In addition, Gusfield has been the PhD advisor or postdoctoral mentor for many well known computer scientists working in computational biology, including Prof. Oliver Eulenstein (Iowa State University), Dr. Paul Horton (Tokyo), Prof. Ming-Yang Kao (Northwestern University), Prof. John Kececioglu (Arizona),  Prof. Yun S. Song (UC Berkeley and Univ. of Pennsylvania), Prof. R. Ravi (CMU), Prof. Jens Stoye (Bielefeld), Prof. Lusheng Wang (City University of Hong Kong), and Prof. Yufeng Wu (U. Connecticut).

Gusfield has made significant contributions to molecular sequence comparison and analysis, phylogenetic tree and phylogenetic network inference, haplotyping in DNA sequences, the multi-state perfect phylogeny problem using chordal graph theory, and fast algorithms for RNA folding.  Since 2014 he has focused on the application and development of integer linear programming in computational biology.

Gusfield is most well known for his book Algorithms on Strings, Trees and Sequences: Computer Science and Computational Biology, which provides a comprehensive presentation of the algorithmic foundations of molecular sequence analysis for computer scientists, and  has been cited more than 6000 times. This book has helped to define and develop the intersection of computer science and computational biology. His second book in computational biology is on phylogenetic networks,  which are graph-theoretic models of evolution that go beyond the classical tree model, to address biological processes such as hybridization, recombination, and horizontal gene transfer.

Awards and honors
Gusfield was named Fellow of the Institute of Electrical and Electronics Engineers (IEEE) in 2015 for contributions to combinatorial optimization and computational biology. In 2016, Gusfield was elected a Fellow of the International Society for Computational Biology (ISCB) for "his notable contributions to computational biology, particularly his algorithmic work on building evolutionary trees, molecular sequence analysis, optimization problems in population genetics, RNA folding, and integer programming in biology." In 2016, Gusfield was named a distinguished professor at the University of California at Davis, which is the highest campus-wide rank.
He was elected an ACM Fellow in 2017.

References

Fellow Members of the IEEE
University of California, Berkeley alumni
University of California, Davis faculty
American computer scientists
Fellows of the Association for Computing Machinery
Fellows of the International Society for Computational Biology
Living people
Year of birth missing (living people)
20th-century American engineers
21st-century American engineers